Bruce Ralston  is a Canadian politician. He is a Member of the Legislative Assembly (MLA) of British Columbia, representing the riding of Surrey-Whalley since 2005. A member of the New Democratic Party (NDP), he has served in the cabinets of Premiers John Horgan and David Eby since 2017, currently as Minister of Forests.

Life and career
Ralston was born in Victoria and grew up in Vancouver. He has degrees in history and law from the University of British Columbia, and a degree in history from the University of Cambridge in England. He was called to the bar in 1982, and has lived in Surrey since 1990, where he ran his own law firm.

Ralston served on the Surrey City Council from 1988 to 1993. He was a member of the board of directors of Vancouver City Savings Credit Union from 1995 to 2006. Between 1996 and 2001, he served as president of the BC NDP.

He ran in the 2001 provincial election as the NDP candidate in Surrey-Panorama Ridge, finishing a distant second behind Liberal candidate Gulzar Cheema. In the 2005 election he instead contested the riding of Surrey-Whalley, winning the seat with 55% of the vote. He kept his seat in the 2009 election, growing his vote share to 66.5%, and was re-elected in 2013, 2017 and 2020. He replaced John Horgan as NDP house leader in March 2014, allowing Horgan to contest the party leadership.

In July 2017, Ralston was named Minister of Jobs, Trade and Technology in the NDP minority government. He swapped portfolios with Michelle Mungall in January 2020, becoming Minister of Energy, Mines and Petroleum Resources. His post was modified to Minister of Energy, Mines and Low Carbon Innovation and Minister Responsible for the Consular Corps of British Columbia in November 2020, and he was appointed Queen's counsel in December of the same year. He was subsequently named Minister of Forests in the Eby ministry on December 7, 2022, while retaining the role of Minister Responsible for the Consular Corps.

Electoral results

|-

|-
 
|NDP
|Bruce Ralston
|align="right"|3,240
|align="right"|19.91
|align="right"|–

|- bgcolor="white"
!align="right" colspan=3|Total Valid Votes
!align="right"|16,272
!align="right"|100.00
!align="right"|
|- bgcolor="white"
!align="right" colspan=3|Total Rejected Ballots
!align="right"|128
!align="right"|0.79
!align="right"|
|- bgcolor="white"
!align="right" colspan=3|Turnout
!align="right"|16,400
!align="right"|69.04
!align="right"|
|}

References

External links

Living people
Year of birth missing (living people)
Members of the Executive Council of British Columbia
British Columbia New Democratic Party MLAs
Politicians from Victoria, British Columbia
Surrey, British Columbia city councillors
Peter A. Allard School of Law alumni
Alumni of the University of Cambridge
21st-century Canadian politicians
Canadian King's Counsel
Lawyers in British Columbia